Rhodoplanes serenus is a Gram-negative, phototrophic, non-sulfur, motile bacterium from the genus of Rhodoplanes which has been isolated from pond water from the Sanshiro-ike pond near the University of Tokyo in Japan.

References

External links
Type strain of Rhodoplanes serenus at BacDive -  the Bacterial Diversity Metadatabase

 

Nitrobacteraceae
Bacteria described in 2009